Carnaval de antaño is a 1940 Argentine film directed by Manuel Romero.

Cast

Florencio Parravicini
Sofía Bozán
Sabina Olmos
Charlo
Enrique Roldán
El Cachafaz
Fernando Campos
Warly Ceriani

References

External links
 

1940 films
1940s Spanish-language films
Argentine black-and-white films
Argentine musical comedy films
1940 musical comedy films
1940s Argentine films